"Homesteading the Noosphere" (abbreviated HtN) is an essay written by Eric S. Raymond about the social workings of open-source software development. It follows his previous piece "The Cathedral and the Bazaar" (1997).

The essay examines issues of project ownership and transfer, as well as investigating possible anthropological roots of the gift culture in open source as contrasted with the exchange culture of closed source software. Raymond also investigates the nature of the spread of open source into the untamed frontier of ideas he terms the noosphere, postulating that projects that range too far ahead of their time fail because they are too far out in the wilderness, and that successful projects tend to relate to existing projects.

Raymond delves into the contrast between the stated aims of open source and observed behaviors, and also explores the underlying motivations of people involved in the open source movement. He notes that a key motivation for open source practitioners is having a great reputation within the "tribe". In contrast, Microsoft's "embrace and extend" policy complexified and closed up Internet protocols with "protocol pollution."

Citations 

"Homesteading the Noosphere" has been referenced in various papers, including:

 The impact of ideology on effectiveness in open source software development teams
 An Overview of the Software Engineering Process and Tools in the Mozilla Project
 From Planning to Mature: on the Determinants of Open Source Take Off, Discussion paper 2005-17, Università degli Studi di Trento
 Open borders? Immigration in open source projects
 Public commons of geographic data: research and development challenges

In popular culture 

The first chapter of the novel series also bears the same name.

See also 

 Calculation in kind, also known as a money-free economy

References
   — also includes "The Cathedral and the Bazaar", "The Magic Cauldron" and "Revenge of the Hackers"

External links
 The essay readable on the web, including a revision-history, 1998–2000.

1998 essays
American essays
Computer science books
Books about free software
Essays about computing
O'Reilly Media books
Software development philosophies
Software engineering papers
Software project management
Essays by Eric S. Raymond
Works about the information economy